This is a list of further education colleges in the Republic of Ireland:

A
Abbey Vocational School
Accounting Technicians Ireland
Athlone Community College

B
Ballyfermot College of Further Education
Blackrock Further Education Institute
Bray Institute of Further Education
Bridgetown Vocational College
Ballsbridge College of Further Education

C
Carndonagh Community School
Castlebar Further of Education
Cavan Institute
Chevron Online Training
Coláiste Chathail Naofa
Coláiste Íde College of Further Education
Coláiste na hÉireann
Coláiste Stiofáin Naofa College of Further Education
College of Progressive Education
Collinstown Park Community College
Confey College
Cork College of Commerce

D
Drogheda Institute of Further Education
Digital Marketing Institute
Dorset College
Dublin City University
Dublin Institute of Technology
Dunboyne College of Further Education
Dundrum College of Further Education

E
ECM: European College of Management

G
Galway Business School
Galway Technical Institute
Glenamaddy Community School
Gorey Community School
Gurteen college

I
Independent College Dublin
Inchicore College of Further Education

K
Kylemore College

L
Liberties College
Limerick College of Further Education

M
Mallow College of Further Education
Marian College
Marino College of Further Education
Moate Business College
Monaghan Institute

O
 Ormonde College

R
Rathmines College of Further Education
Ringsend Technical Institute
Rossa College

S
Sancta Maria College
Scoil Aireagail
Scoil Chonglais
Setanta College
St. Brendan's College
St. John's Central College
St. Oliver Post Primary School

T
 Tralee Community College

W
Waterford College of Further Education
Westport CFE - Carrowbeg College
Warnborough College

See also
List of further education colleges in England
List of further education colleges in Scotland
List of further education colleges in Wales

References
 QualifaX - List of Education facilities in the Republic of Ireland

Further education colleges
Lists of organisations based in the Republic of Ireland